Budrukuchi, also spelled as Budru Kuchi, is a census village in Nalbari district, Assam, India. As per the 2011 Census of India, Budrukuchi village has a total population of 2,565 people, including 1,317 males and 1,248 females with a literacy rate of 81.91%.

References 

Villages in Nalbari district